Albert Edward Keating (28 June 1902 – 18 October 1984) was an English footballer who played as an inside left. He made 175 Football League appearances in the years after the First World War.

Career
Keating played locally for Prudhoe Castle, then joined Newcastle United for £130 in January 1922. Alex Raisbeck signed Smailes for £650 in November 1925 for  Bristol City. Keating joined Blackburn Rovers along with Clarrie Bourton for £4,000 in May 1928. He moved to Cardiff City in February 1931 before rejoining Bristol City in November 1932. In July 1933 Keating returned to his native north-east and joined North Shields. His last club was Throckley Welfare. After retiring from playing Keating became a referee on Tyneside.

Keating's younger brother Reg also played League football.

Honours
with Bristol City
Football League Third Division South winner: 1926–27

References

1902 births
1984 deaths
People from Swillington
English footballers
Association football inside forwards
English Football League players
Northern Football League players
Newcastle United F.C. players
Blackburn Rovers F.C. players
Bristol City F.C. players
Cardiff City F.C. players
North Shields F.C. players
Throckley Welfare F.C. players
Footballers from Leeds